WTLE-LP, UHF analog channel 18, was a low-powered Telefutura-affiliated television station licensed to Fort Myers, Florida, United States. The station was owned by Silver Point Capital. The station has, in the past, carried programming from the Pax network; it has also been a repeater for sister Univision affiliate WUVF-LP.

WTLE has previously been owned by Paxson Communications, Tiger Eye Broadcasting, and Equity Media Holdings.

On April 4, 2008, Equity announced the sale of all five of its Southwest Florida stations (including WTLE) to Luken Communications, LLC for $8 million. Equity has cited corporate financial losses as a reason for the sale.

Equity Media Holdings has been in chapter 11 bankruptcy since December 2008 and offers by Luken Communications to acquire Equity-owned stations in six markets have since been withdrawn.

Silver Point Capital acquired WTLE at auction on April 16, 2009.  The sale closed on August 17, 2009.

Three days before the completion of the sale to Silver Point, WTLE was taken silent. On March 10, 2011, its license was cancelled by the FCC, and its call sign was deleted from the FCC's database.

After the stations sign-off, the Fort Myers market could only receive Telefutura/UniMas programming via the network's national feed until 2014, when WUVF-LP (channel 2) signed on a second digital sub-channel affiliated with the network.

References

Equity Media Holdings
TLE-LP
Defunct television stations in the United States
Television channels and stations disestablished in 2011
Television channels and stations established in 1995
1995 establishments in Florida
2011 disestablishments in Florida
TLE-LP